Zhuhai Zhongfu(珠海中富) Enterprise Co., Ltd. engages in the production and supply of PET bottles in China. It offers PET bottles for soft drinks, mineral water, distilled water, tea, and beer. The company's products also include bottle labels, film, and packing paper boxes. Zhuhai Zhongfu Enterprise Co., Ltd. is based in Zhuhai city, Guangdong province, China.

Zhuhai Zhongfu Enterprises Co. has been listed on the Shenzhen market since 1996.

Ownership 
CVC Capital Partners acquired a 29% stake in the company in 2007, paying $US225 million.  This made CVC the largest single shareholder in the company.

Operations 
The company has operations throughout China and produces approximately 12 billion PET bottles a year.

References

External links 
Zhuhai Zhongfu Web Site

Packaging companies of China
Companies with year of establishment missing
CVC Capital Partners companies